Mountlake Terrace High School is a public high school located in Mountlake Terrace, Washington, United States. Mountlake Terrace HS is known for its Jazz Band and basketball program, which has won the Wesco Championship eight times. It is the third largest high school in the Edmonds School District. Mountlake Terrace HS participates in the Washington Interscholastic Activities Association, having reclassified from 3A to 2A at the start of 2016–2017 school year.

Academics

STEM education
Mountlake Terrace is a registered Project Lead the Way magnet school. This national program aims to educate middle and high schoolers in STEM curriculum. The school offers engineering and robotics classes for college and university level credit if an AP exam is taken. The school offers college-level engineering classes that offer college credit through the College in the High School program at local Edmonds Community College. The school also offers several Advanced Placement classes.

"Small schools" initiative
In September 2003 the school reorganized under five "small schools," each with a specific emphasis: the Terrace Academy of Arts and Sciences; the Discovery School; the Innovation School; the Renaissance School; and the Achievement, Opportunity and Scholarship School. The school received a $833,000 grant in return for their participation. The effort was met with mixed reactions. Students were to stay in a school until their junior year, or to file a petition with a school administrator to transfer between programs. The "small schools" program ended in 2008, after which MTHS returned to a traditional high school format.

Activities

ASB
Mountlake Terrace has an active leadership program that organizes and promotes events relating to the school. The Executive ASB, known as "The Big 6", consists of the President, Vice President, Secretary, Treasurer, Public Relations, and Historian. The Big 6 functions as the team of student leaders tasked with developing, planning, and implementing events that build positive school community and spirit such as fundraisers, community service, assemblies, and school dances.

Theater department
The Mountlake Terrace Theatre Department is a well-recognized program at the local, regional, state, and national levels. The Theatre program has represented Washington state at the International Thespian Festival, an international competition and conference, on three separate occasions.

Music program
There are two concert bands and two jazz bands, as well as a percussion ensemble, one choir, and two orchestras. The upper-level concert band, Chamber Winds, is a regular attendee at music festivals such as the University of Washington Music Festival and Central Washington University's music festival. They also toured Europe in 2008. The school's upper jazz band, Jazz 1, has attended Jazz at Lincoln Center's Essentially Ellington Jazz Festival and Competition in New York in 2000, 2002, 2005, 2008, 2011, 2012, 2017, 2018 and 2020; they placed third in the competition in 2005 and in 2011. They also received an honorable mention in 2002. The jazz band has gone on several European tours. The top jazz choir, Dynamics, was a winner of the Lionel Hampton Jazz Festival in Idaho in 2007, the third win in a row for the choir.

FRC 
The school hosts FIRST Robotics Competition (FRC) team "Chill Out". The team was founded in 2006, and participated in FRC every year except 2021 due to the COVID-19 pandemic. Chill Out participated in the FIRST Robotics World Championships in Houston, Texas in 2017 and 2018.

TSA 
The Technology Student Association (TSA) club at Mountlake Terrace HS boasts the largest highschool chapter in the state of Washington. At the 2022 WTSA conference, the chapter won first place in Animatronics, Dragster Design, Technology Bowl, and Structural Design in a sweep.

Athletics

Mountlake Terrace High School's athletics department offers these programs for the 2017-2018 year: boys' football, girls' volleyball, boys' tennis, cross country, girls' soccer, girls' swimming, boys' basketball, girls' basketball, boys' swimming, wrestling, track and field, soccer, girls' tennis, boys' baseball, girls' fastpitch softball, golf (boys' and girls').

Mountlake Terrace won the state 4A boys' soccer title in the 1974/1975 season, defeating Newport High School (Bellevue) 3-2 in the championship game.

Mountlake Terrace won the state AAA basketball title in 1976/77 season, defeating Richland High School in the state championship game with a season record of 27-1.

From 1999 through 2002 the wrestling team was named the 4A academic state champions.

In 2010, the Mountlake Terrace baseball team won the 4A District 1 Championship by defeating the Kamiak Knights 4-3 at Everett Memorial Stadium. The Hawks finished that season 18-7, with several players going on to play at the next level.

The Hawks baseball team were named 2A Academic State Champions in 2018.

History and facilities

The high school opened on September 6, 1960, to serve the growing community of Mountlake Terrace, with an initial enrollment of 500 students. The existing school is a replacement facility constructed in 1991, designed by Bassetti Architects.

Notable alumni
 Seamus Boxley, professional basketball player; played professionally overseas
 Ariana DeBoo, singer-songwriter, graduated in 2010
Devante Downs, NFL linebacker for the Minnesota Vikings
Lily Gladstone, actress, graduated in 2004. Stars in upcoming film Killers of the Flower Moon
 Mark O'Connor, fiddler (musician)
 Ryan Strieby, professional baseball player; plays first base for the Camden Riversharks, a non-MLB-affiliated team

See also 

 Edmonds School District

References

External links
 Mountlake Terrace High School website
 The Hawkeye
 MTHS bands website
 Greatschools.org
 Catherine A. Wallach, Converting a Comprehensive High School Into Small Learning Communities: A Case Study of Mountlake Terrace High School, 2002

Educational institutions established in 1960
High schools in Snohomish County, Washington
Public high schools in Washington (state)
Magnet schools in Washington (state)
1960 establishments in Washington (state)